Fowlerina, one kind of "sea angel", is a genus of small sea slugs, marine opisthobranch gastropod mollusks in the family Clionidae.

Sometimes called pteropods, these are floating pelagic creatures which swim by flapping two wing-like extensions of their body known as parapodia.

Please also see: Sea angel and Clionidae.

Species
Species in the genus Fowlerina include:
 Fowlerina punctata Tesch, 1903
 Fowlerina zetesios Pelseneer, 1906

References

Clionidae